Modh is an Indian caste. Its members are people who use the name and originate from Modhera in Gujarat.

Culture 
In that state and in Rajasthan, Lords Brahma, Vishnu, and Mahesh created Brahmins who were masters in Vedas, so that they can turn Dharmaranya in a centre of veda Sanskrit. The lords asked Vishwakarma to build houses, forts, and temples for the Brahmins. Brahma, Vishnu, and Mahesh created six thousand Brahmins each. They gave them gotras and gotrasdevi. 

According to legend, the people created by Vishnu were sober and honest; the people created by Brahma were rajas; and people created by Shiva were angry. The Brahmins approved their work. Brahma created Kamdhenu Caw, and on the order of Brahma Kamdhenu, created 36,000 people by scratching the earth with her nails. They were known as Gobhuja or Gobhva.

History 
The people settled in Modhera, so the village became known as Gabhu. Adhalja, Mandaliya, Madhukara, Modh Modi, Teli Modi, Champaneri Modi, and Prema Modi were all groups of Modh Vaniks. Modh famers were known as Modh Patel. 

Many Hindu communities take their name from a town, such as Modh Brahmin, Modh Patel, Modh Modi and Modh Bania. Where four groups share a similar toponym, the Patel group are often farmers, and the Brahmin group often traditionally acted as priests. In the case of Modhera, at least one other group, the Modh Modi. Some journalists suggested that they are prosperous and mainly in textiles, grocery, finance and diamond trades.

People 

 Mahatma Gandhi, icon of the Indian independence movement, belonged to Modh-Bania caste. 
 Hemachandra the Indian Jain scholar, poet, mathematician and polymath was a Modh.
 Narendra Modi, 14th and the current Prime Minister of India, belongs to Modh-Ghanchi caste.
 The Ambani family, one of the richest families, belong to Modh-Bania caste.

References

Brahmin communities of Gujarat
Bania communities
Oil pressing castes
Social groups of Gujarat